The Edinburgh class (also known as the Pearl class) is a series of post-Panamax container built for Rickmers Group and Zodiac Maritime and were chartered to Maersk The ships were built by Hyundai Heavy Industries.

History
The series was ordered from Hyundai Heavy Industries in 2007 to 2008 and delivered starting July 2010. The client of the series is the Hamburg-based Rickmers Group, and were chartered to Maersk.

The Maersk Edinburgh class, along with the Explorer class were designed for a slow steaming container service from Europe to East Asia. The beginning of the service with the abbreviations FAL 5 and AE8 was already planned for the summer of 2009, but was not realised due to the financial crisis of 2007–2008. It will run through the ports of Le Havre, Hamburg, Rotterdam, Zeebrugge, Port Kelang, Singapore, Ningbo, Shanghai, Shenzhen-Yantian, Tanjung Pelepas, Port Kelang, and back to Le Havre. As of 2010, the ships of the Maersk Edinburgh class were introduced to the FAL5 / AE8 Far East Europe service.

Records
The Maersk Elba visited Gdansk on May 11, 2011, becoming the largest container vessel ever handled by a Baltic Sea port, and then visited Port of Haifa in 2017 to set a record for the largest ship to dock in Israel.

Ships

See also

References

External links 
 Ship information from Rickmers Group (13.000 TEU Class)

Container ship classes
Ships of the Maersk Line
Maersk Line
Ships built by Hyundai Heavy Industries Group